Rear Admiral Eric Gascoigne Robinson  (16 May 1882 – 20 August 1965) was a Royal Navy officer and an English recipient of the Victoria Cross, the highest award for gallantry in the face of the enemy that can be awarded to British and Commonwealth forces. He earned his award by going ashore and single-handedly destroying a Turkish naval gun battery while a lieutenant commander with the fleet stationed off the Dardanelles during the Gallipoli campaign in the First World War.

After these exploits, he was badly wounded on the front line on the Gallipoli Peninsula, but recovered and served continuously for the remainder of the war and into the Russian Civil War. In 1939 aged 57, he again volunteered for military service and spent three more years at sea, commanding convoys during the Battle of the Atlantic. During his lengthy career, Robinson remained a highly regarded officer who had served through four wars.

Early life
Eric Gascoigne Robinson was born in 1882 at Greenwich in Kent, to John Lovell Robinson and Louisa Aveline Gascoigne. John was the chaplain of the Royal Naval College at Greenwich and Eric's youth was spent in preparation for a life at sea. Robinson was educated at St John's School, Leatherhead before joining HMS Britannia aged fifteen in 1897 and rapidly progressed to the battleship  and then the first class protected cruiser , in which he took part in suppressing the Boxer Rebellion in China. It was here, aged 18, that he saw his first action with the relief force, being wounded in action, mentioned in despatches and gaining a reputation as a daring and resourceful officer.

In 1913, he married Edith Gladys Cordeux, with whom he had three children. Robinson was slightly injured in a train accident shortly after his wedding, but soon recovered and was dispatched to the Mediterranean Sea at the outbreak of the First World War on board the old battleship .

Gallipoli campaign and the Victoria Cross
The exploit in his Victoria Cross nomination was the result of Robinson's close friendship and working relationship with another aggressive officer, Roger Keyes, whom he had first met in China fifteen years before. Keyes was asked by his superior, Admiral John de Robeck, to prepare an assault on the Turkish gun battery at Orkanieh (also known as Achilles' Tomb), a position between Kum Kale and Yeni Shehr on the southern shore of the Dardanelles. This position had withstood fire from the battleships of the Allied fleet during the preceding weeks. Robinson was suggested as the leader of a commando force of sailors and Royal Marines tasked with destroying the battery and withdrawing in good order. 

Robinson accepted the mission without hesitation. His force landed undetected early in the morning of 26 February, destroyed two small artillery pieces and made fast progress towards the main battery before being pinned down by Turkish snipers in the mid-afternoon. The white naval uniforms of the sailors proved an easy target for the Turks and casualties mounted as Turkish reinforcements were brought up to cut off the raiding party. Instead of withdrawing in the face of this threat, Robinson marched his men through gullies and came out close to a small rise behind the main battery. The open ground of the rise was covered by several Turkish snipers, but realising the importance of removing the artillery overlooking the sea passage, Robinson delegated command of the party to a junior officer and made the climb alone, dodging bullets in his white uniform until he crested the rise unhurt, emerging a few minutes later and starting back apparently unconcerned by the increasingly heavy gunfire directed at him. He was said to be "strolling around ... under heavy rifle fire ... like a sparrow enjoying a bath from a garden hose". The battery had been ungarrisoned, and Robinson was able to lay fuses which destroyed the large 9.4" main gun and two anti-aircraft emplacements within the position. Withdrawing in good order, Robinson evaded the Turkish reinforcements and then directed gunfire from the fleet onto their positions, including a force garrisoning an ancient tomb, inflicting heavy casualties.

During March, in preparation for the landings on the peninsula, Robinson led four sorties into the extensive sea minefields around the beaches and bays of Gallipoli. On one of these, his minesweeper was struck by small calibre shells 84 times and the other operations were scarcely less dangerous but, in spite of the Turkish resistance, Robinson was able to clear wide lanes for the invasion forces.

E15 mission
 Robinson volunteered in April for an even more dangerous mission, following the Turkish capture of  submarine HMS E15 which had stranded below the guns of Fort Dardanus near Kepez Point. All efforts to destroy this craft had so far failed and it was considered vital for naval morale that it was not salvaged by the enemy. Caught in a blaze of searchlights, and under heavy fire from the Turkish artillery and machine guns, both boats miraculously arrived unscathed. A carelessly-directed Turkish searchlight briefly illuminated E15. The boat from HMS Majestic under the command of Lt Goodwin seized the opportunity and attacked. The first torpedo missed, and seconds later the boat was struck by a shell that blew away much of her stern, mortally wounding one of her crew and causing her irreparable damage. Undeterred, Goodwin went in again and scored a direct hit with his second torpedo, just forward of the conning tower, wrecking the submarine. [[File:HMS Triumph picket boat.jpg|thumb|right|HMS Triumph'''s picket boat returning to the battleship after the E15 expedition.]]

Observing his consort's plight, Robinson did not hesitate, steaming to the stricken vessel and rescuing her crew before escaping downstream to Mudros. It was estimated that the Turks fired at least 500 heavy calibre rounds of ammunition at the two boats in just a few minutes. A German officer present noted that "I have never on the course of the war seen an attack carried out with such pluck and fearlessness". It has also been commented that this action should have brought Robinson a second Victoria Cross, but he was promoted to Commander by special decree instead.

Later war service
In August, Robinson was sent to Anzac Cove as a naval liaison officer and on his second day there, was badly wounded near the front line, forcing his evacuation to the UK, where King George V presented him with his medal at Buckingham Palace. Returned to the Mediterranean in December 1915 following his recuperation, he took over the coastal monitor HMS M21, in which he shelled Turkish positions throughout Egypt and Palestine and was awarded another mention in despatches and the Egyptian Order of the Nile, 4th Class. Returning to England in the summer of 1917, he narrowly missed selection for Keyes's operations against Zeebrugge and Ostend owing to his war wounds. He commanded the secret D.C.B. Section of the Royal Navy's Signals School, Portsmouth at Calshot. This led to a distant posting in the Caspian Sea during the Russian Civil War, fighting the Bolshevik forces along the Russian coastline. Robinson commanded a squadron of coastal torpedo boats in the Caspian and forced the surrender of several enemy forts through aggressive tactics. These achievements would later win him the Imperial Russian Order of St. Anne, 2nd Class. His most notable achievement at this time was leading a small coastal motor boat inside the harbour of Fort Alexandrovsk, where he sank a barge and prompted a mass surrender from the garrison.

Peacetime and Second World War service

Following this period of extended service, Robinson was brought home, appointed Officer of the Order of the British Empire by the King for his Caspian Sea service, promoted again to captain and posted to HMS Iron Duke. Robinson then served in a number of training establishments and dockyards, as well as a brief stint with the Far East Fleet, during which he received the Japanese Order of the Sacred Treasure, Third Class for his services. In 1925, he was inducted into the Freemasons and remained a prominent member of the Navy Lodge for the rest of his life. The organisation still commemorates him in their publications. He retired at age 51 in 1933 as a rear-admiral, but when the Second World War broke out, Robinson immediately offered his services and for three years, commanded convoys across the Atlantic Ocean. For this service, he was later presented with the Norwegian King Haakon VII's Freedom Cross. Eventually a bout of ill-health caused by a combination of the strain of long service, his age, and the death of his son, Midshipman Edward Cordeaux Robinson, in the sinking of the cruiser HMS Neptune in December 1941, prompted a second retirement in 1942.

Retirement and death
Robinson settled in the village of Langrish, near Petersfield in east Hampshire. He died peacefully at Haslar Naval Hospital, Gosport, on 20 August 1965 and was laid to rest at St John's, the village church he had served for 20 years as warden. For unknown reasons, his grave was without a headstone until 1998, although a large plaque to him was dedicated by his sister in 1969 and surmounts the altar. Following investigations by the Naval VC Association, his grave was discovered and a Commonwealth War Graves Commission headstone erected. At the dedication ceremony, attended  by over 150 friends, relatives, Masons and servicemen, Admiral Derek Reffell gave the eulogy which stated: "The admiral was a hero, but more importantly he was a naval man from the finest mould. Now at last we can accord him the dignity he deserves."

Citations

Commemoration

On 26 February 2015, one hundred years after his VC-winning deed, a commemorative paving stone was laid outside Robinson's former home at 1 Diamond Terrace, Greenwich. At the event Commander Operations, Rear Admiral Matthew Parr said he was in awe of Lt Cdr Robinson’s "selfless actions" and added: "His courage, determination and fortitude in the face of overwhelming enemy action remain an example to us all; this commemorative stone will serve as a permanent memorial to a remarkable man."

Notes

References

Clayton, Carl (2017). Kipper VC: the life and times of Rear Admiral Eric Robinson VC.'' Published by the author.

External links
Location of grave and VC medal – The History of the Victoria Cross
Find-A-Grave profile for Eric Gascoigne Robinson
Short biography at The Graveyards of Gallipoli, www.diggerhistory.info/
Kipper VC – the life and times of Eric Robinson VC 
VC Stone Unveiling Greenwich

1882 births
1965 deaths
People from Greenwich
British Gallipoli campaign recipients of the Victoria Cross
Officers of the Order of the British Empire
Recipients of the Order of St. Anna
Recipients of the Order of the Sacred Treasure
Recipients of the Croix de Guerre (France)
Chevaliers of the Légion d'honneur
Recipients of the King Haakon VII Freedom Cross
Royal Navy admirals of World War II
Royal Navy recipients of the Victoria Cross
Royal Navy personnel of the Boxer Rebellion
Royal Navy officers of World War I
People educated at St John's School, Leatherhead
Military personnel from Kent